Asia Pacific League of Associations for Rheumatology (APLAR) is a federation of organisations of rheumatology. It was established in Sydney in 1963 and the first congress was held in 1968 in Mumbai at the Taj Mahal Palace Hotel.

History
In 1961, the ILAR, International League of Associations of Rheumatology, authorised two Australian rheumatologists to initiate a regional league for Asia Pacific and the organisation, then called SEAPAL was founded in 1963 with four member nations, namely Australia, India, New Zealand and Japan with Dr S Nelson of Australia as the founder President. Over the years the organisation has grown to 27 members including China and Taiwan.

Organisation
APLAR is a confederation of individual Rheumatology Associations that represent different countries of the Asia-Pacific. The office bearers are nominated and elected by the individual member states. The executive consists of the President, Secretary General, Vice President, Treasurer, Deputy Secretary General, immediate past President, President Elect besides the Editor of the association journal (Int J of Rheum Dis). In addition there are subcommittees and special interest groups. The first President of then SEAPAL was Dr S Nelson from Australia while the current President of APLAR is Dr Syed Atiqul Haq from Bangladesh.

Affiliated National Organisations

Australian Rheumatology Association
Bangladesh Rheumatology Society
Chinese Rheumatology Association
Indian Rheumatology Association
Japan College of Rheumatology
Malaysian Society of Rheumatology
New Zealand Rheumatology Association
Pakistan Rheumatology Society
Sri Lanka Association of Rheumatology and Medical Rehabilitation
Taiwan Rheumatology Association
Tajikistan Rheumatology Society

Activities
APLAR is actively involved in promoting and nurturing national rheumatology societies in countries where rheumatologists are scarce. It has fostered COPCORD projects in several member countries in association with WHO and ILAR. APLAR has special interest groups in different rheumatic diseases and research areas. The most important activity of APLAR is the Annual Congress that is held in different Asian cities every year.

Congresses
The first SEAPAL Congress was held in 1968 at Mumbai, then Bombay which were held every four years until 2000 when the APLAR Congress became biennial until 2010 before switching to an annual rhythm.
List of SEAPAL/APLAR Congresses
 1968	SEAPAL CONGRESS	Mumbai, India
 1972 	SEAPAL CONGRESS	Kyoto, Japan
 1976	SEAPAL CONGRESS	Singapore
 1980	SEAPAL CONGRESS	Manila, Philippines
 1984	SEAPAL CONGRESS	Bangkok, Thailand
 1988	SEAPAL CONGRESS	Tokyo, Japan
 1990	APLAR Symposium Seoul, South Korea
 1992	APLAR CONGRESS Bali, Indonesia
 1994	APLAR Symposium Kuala Lumpur, Malaysia
 1996 	APLAR CONGRESS Melbourne, Australia
 1998	APLAR Symposium Manila, Philippines
 2000	APLAR CONGRESS Beijing, China (9th)
 2002	APLAR CONGRESS Bangkok, Thailand
 2004	APLAR CONGRESS Jeju Island, South Korea
 2006	APLAR CONGRESS Kuala Lumpur, Malaysia
 2008	APLAR CONGRESS Yokohama, Japan
 2010	APLAR CONGRESS Hong Kong
 2011	APLAR Symposium Taipei, Taiwan
 2012	APLAR CONGRESS Amman, Dead Sea, Jordan
 2013	APLAR Symposium Bali, Indonesia
 2014	APLAR CONGRESS Cebu, Philippines
 2015	APLAR CONGRESS Chennai, India
 2016	APLAR CONGRESS Shanghai, China
 2017	APLAR CONGRESS Taiwan

Journal 
The league publishes its APLAR Journal of Rheumatology in the International Journal of Rheumatic Diseases, a peer-reviewed medical journal.

References

External links

 Special Commemorative issue of APLAR Journal of Rheumatology Volume 6, No 2
 APLAR Perspectives special collection in Nature Reviews Rheumatology

Rheumatology organizations